Carabus melancholicus is a species of beetle from family Carabidae, found in France, Portugal, and Spain. They could also be found in Morocco. They are brownish-black coloured.

Subspecies
Carabus melancholicus costatus Germar, 1824
Carabus melancholicus melancholicus Fabricius, 1798
Carabus melancholicus submeridionalis Breuning, 1975

References

External links
Photo of Carabus melancholicus on Flickr

melancholicus
Beetles described in 1798